Age of Glory 2  is a Chinese drama series which is co-produce by Double Vision and ntv7. It is telecast on every Monday to Thursday, at 10 pm on Malaysia's ntv7 station.

History
When Age of Glory was first aired in 2008, it unexpectedly became a big hit among local television viewers in Malaysia. The locally produced drama series garnered a record viewership of 800,000, making it the highest-rated local Chinese series for the year across all free-to-air TV channels in the country.

Synopsis
Age of Glory 2 is ntv7's first extravagant locally produced TV series in 2010. The filming works started on 1 March 2010 in Penang. The 40-episode full-length TV nostalgia spans three decades, from the late 1930s to the late 1960s. A total amount of RM3 million was invested in this movie which was filmed in Penang, Taiping, Kuala Selangor and Seremban.

Set in the 1940s, the plot fell between 1938 and 1968, described Malaya in that 30 years, with the turbulent situation in World War II era, the ancestors worked hard from the south of China, where the roots of the hard stories Malaysia will certainly be nostalgic whirlwind television fad, pulling the audience into the various memorable old Nanyang feelings!

Three men will tell how to their life changes from China to Malaysia. The audience this year is certainly will be served with the most anticipated local television production.

Age of Glory 2 is the story about the time when mainland China was in turmoil. The three hardships are Japanese invasion of China, Kuomintang civil strife and inflation. This has led the people from China to emigrate.

At that time, the British were still ruling Malaya, a country rich in natural resources. Malaya has attracted many foreign investors. That's when the British-appointed Chinese leaders - Kapitan. Due to that, exploitation by British had been done to emigrants in labour work, covering mining tin, tapping, port coolies, etc.

Age of Glory 2 lets the audience discover the hardship of Ma Ying (Li Ming Zhong), Yapa (Cai Ke Li) and Lin Sheng (Wu Weibin) leaving home for Malaya to find a new life, and experience difficulty in the Second World War, Japanese and British occupation days, and until the independence of Malaya. They will also met their true love,  Ye Feng (Wu Tianyu), Zheng Peiqi (Shujun) and Qi Wan Yue (Hishiko Wu Pei). They will experience the ups and downs of life, sadness, hardships, and some realising their dream.

The show has attracted huge audience and outstanding review among the Malaysian audience.

Casts

Main cast

Production
 Most of the screen were shot at Penang, such as: Khoo Khongsi, Baba and Nyonya Museum, Chew's Jetty etc.
 The costumes in the drama included British Army Uniform and Japanese Army Uniform all were custom made, the opera costume worn by Debbie Goh cost RM 5000.

References

Age of Glory returns for second season, The Sun newspaper, 22 June 2010
Glory days, The Star newspaper, 14 June 2010
Better life, The Star newspaper, 16 June 2010
Drama filmed in Penang, The Star newspaper, 13 March 2010

External links
Age of Glory II (情牵南洋) Official Portal, ntv7 Malaysia
ntv7 teaser
Opening Sequence
Theme song

Chinese-language drama television series in Malaysia
2010 Malaysian television series debuts
2010 Malaysian television series endings
NTV7 original programming
Channel 8 (Singapore) original programming